Shabbethai Premsla was a Galician philologist and scribe of the sixteenth and seventeenth centuries who lived in Przemyśl, Poland, from which his name derives.

Premsla was the author of a commentary on Moses Kimhi's grammatical work, Sefer Mahalak, in which he defends the author against the criticism of Elijah Levita, a commentator on the same work. His annotations to the prayers, which were published in Dyhernfurth, Poland, were reprinted many times. He was a Talmudic scholar, and one of his responsa, on the writing of the Tetragrammaton, is found in the Teshubot ha-Geonim, published in Amsterdam in 1707. Four of his works, which were left in manuscript, are known, including one on the necessity of grammatical studies. Hayyim Bochner was his pupil.

References

Talmudists
Medieval Hebraists
Jews from Galicia (Eastern Europe)